Warsaw Cut Glass Company is a historic factory building located at Warsaw, Kosciusko County, Indiana making cut glass. It is a two-story, plus basement, industrial building constructed of paving brick.  The building measures 100 feet by 25 feet.  Two small additions were constructed in 1912 and the building features an original handpainted sign added in 1915.  The company remains in operation.

It was added to the National Register of Historic Places in 1984.

References

External links
Warsaw Cut Glass Company website

Glassmaking companies of the United States
Industrial buildings and structures on the National Register of Historic Places in Indiana
Industrial buildings completed in 1911
Buildings and structures in Kosciusko County, Indiana
National Register of Historic Places in Kosciusko County, Indiana